is a railway station in the city of Seki, Gifu Prefecture, Japan, operated by the third sector railway operator Nagaragawa Railway.

Lines

Station layout
Sekiterasumae Station has one ground-level side platform serving a single bi-directional track. The station is unattended.

Adjacent stations

|-
!colspan=5|Nagaragawa Railway

History
The station, originally named  was opened on December 11, 1986.
The station name was changed to Sekiterasumae on March 12, 2022.

Surrounding area
Gifu Cutlery Hall

Seki post Office

See also
 List of Railway Stations in Japan

References

External links

 

Railway stations in Japan opened in 1986
Railway stations in Gifu Prefecture
Stations of Nagaragawa Railway
Seki, Gifu